The year 2020 is the 10th year in the history of the Fight Nights Global, a mixed martial arts promotion based in Russia. The company continues broadcasts through Match TV and Fight Network.

List of events

Festival Stepping into Immortality

Festival Stepping into Immortality was a mixed martial arts event held by Fight Nights Global on March 1, 2020 at the Dynamo Palace Of Sports in Yekaterinburg, Russia.

Fight Card

MMA Festival: 75th Anniversary of the Great Victory

MMA Festival: 75th Anniversary of the Great Victory was a mixed martial arts event held by Fight Nights Global on August 28, 2020 at the KSK Express in Rostov on Don, Russia.

Fight Card

Fight Nights Global & GFC: Abdulmanap Nurmagomedov Memory Tournament

'Fight Nights Global & GFC: Abdulmanap Nurmagomedov Memory Tournament' was a mixed martial arts event held by Fight Nights Global on September 9, 2020 at the Irina Viner-Usmanova Gymnastics Palace in Moscow, Russia.

Fight Card

Fight Nights Global 97

Fight Nights Global 97 was a mixed martial arts event held by Fight Nights Global on September 19, 2020 in Elista, Russia.

Fight Card

Fight Nights Global 98: Amirov vs Bikrev

Fight Nights Global 98: Amirov vs Bikrev was a mixed martial arts event held by Fight Nights Global on September 25, 2020 in Moscow, Russia.

Fight Card

AMC Fight Nights Global: Winter Cup

AMC Fight Nights Global: Winter Cup was a mixed martial arts event held by Fight Nights Global on December 24, 2020 at Basket Hall in Moscow, Russia.

Fight Card

AMC Fight Nights Global 99

AMC Fight Nights Global 99 was a mixed martial arts event held by Fight Nights Global on December 25, 2020 in Moscow, Russia.

Fight Card

See also
2020 in UFC
2020 in ONE Championship
2020 in Rizin Fighting Federation
2020 in Konfrontacja Sztuk Walki
2020 in Absolute Championship Akhmat
2020 in Legacy Fighting Alliance

References

Fight Nights Global events
2020 in mixed martial arts
AMC Fight Nights